Defending champion Serena Williams defeated Justine Henin in the final, 6–4, 3–6, 6–2 to win the women's singles title at the 2010 Australian Open. It was her fifth Australian Open singles title and twelfth major singles title overall, surpassing the Open Era record (jointly held by Margaret Court, Steffi Graf, Monica Seles and Evonne Goolagong Cawley) for the most Australian Open singles titles. This was Henin's first major since the 2008 Australian Open, following her retirement in May 2008. Henin was unseeded at a major for the first time since the 2001 Australian Open, and was awarded a wild card into the tournament.

Li Na entered the top 10 in the WTA rankings for the first time by reaching the semifinals, becoming the first Chinese player to achieve the feat.

Seeds

Note: Yanina Wickmayer, who would have been placed in the entry list on the initial entry cutoff date of 7 December 2009 and seeded 16th, entered late and played the qualifying tournament.

Qualifying

Draw

Finals

Top half

Section 1

Section 2

Section 3

Section 4

Bottom half

Section 5

Section 6

Section 7

Section 8

Championship match statistics

References

External links
 2010 Australian Open – Women's draws and results at the International Tennis Federation

Women's Singles
Australian Open (tennis) by year – Women's singles
2010 in Australian women's sport